The Manchester Yankees was the name of two distinct American minor league baseball franchises representing Manchester, New Hampshire, in the Class B New England League (1948 through July 5, 1949) and the Double-A Eastern League (1969–71). Each franchise played at Gill Stadium and each was affiliated with Major League Baseball's New York Yankees.

History
The Manchester Yankees continued Manchester's long history of membership in the New England League that began in 1887. The Yankees were preceded in New England League play by the Manchester Farmers (1887), Manchester Maroons (1888),  Manchester Amoskeags (1891), Manchester (1892–1893), Manchester Manchesters (1899), Manchester (1901–1905), Manchester Textiles (1906, 1914–1915) and  Manchester Blue Sox (1926–1930). The Manchester Indians played in the 1934 Northeastern League. The New England League Manchester teams were preceded by the Manchester Reds, who were the first minor league baseball team in Manchester, beginning play as members of the 1877 New England Association.

Postwar Class B team
When the New England League (NEL) was revived after World War II, Manchester was a charter member as an affiliate and namesake of the New York Giants. The 1946–47 Manchester Giants each finished in third place during the regular season and qualified for the playoffs, but they were eliminated in the 1946 semi-finals by the Lynn Red Sox and in the 1947 finals by the Nashua Dodgers.

The Yankees then replaced the Giants as the team's parent for 1948. However, the 1948 Manchester Yankees finished four games out of the playoffs and drew the third-smallest attendance in the league. The 1949 edition compiled a record of only 28–44, and dropped out of the league on July 5 — one of four franchises to fold during the NEL's final season.

Notable alumni (Manchester Giants)
 
George Bamberger
Bob Cain
Charlie Fox
Alex Konikowski
Johnny Pramesa
Sal Yvars

Notable alumni (Manchester Yankees)
Clint Courtney
Hank Foiles

Double-A franchise
After the 1968 season, Boston businessman John Alevizos acquired the Yankees' Eastern League affiliate, the Binghamton Triplets, and moved it to Gill Stadium as the Manchester Yankees. In 1969, the franchise led the league in attendance, drawing over 91,000 fans despite finishing in next-to-last place. The 1970 team again finished next to last but plunged to the bottom of the league in attendance. The final, 1971 edition of the Manchester Yankees finished last in its division, and reached a new low in attendance, with just less than 29,000 fans passing through the turnstiles. The team then relocated to Connecticut under new ownership as the West Haven Yankees — winning an Eastern League championship in its maiden season.

Manchester did not receive another Eastern League franchise until 2004, when the New Haven Ravens transferred to Gill Stadium as the New Hampshire Fisher Cats.

Notable alumni
 
Ron Blomberg
Tom Buskey
Mario Guerrero
Doc Medich
Gerry Pirtle
Charlie Sands
Rusty Torres

See also
Gill Stadium
New Hampshire Fisher Cats

References

External links
Manchester, New Hampshire, Baseball Reference

Defunct Eastern League (1938–present) teams
New York Yankees minor league affiliates
Professional baseball teams in New Hampshire
Sports in Manchester, New Hampshire
Baseball teams established in 1948
Baseball teams disestablished in 1949
Baseball teams established in 1969
Sports clubs disestablished in 1971
1946 establishments in New Hampshire
1949 disestablishments in New Hampshire
1969 establishments in New Hampshire
1971 disestablishments in New Hampshire
New York Giants minor league affiliates
Defunct baseball teams in New Hampshire
New England League teams
Baseball teams disestablished in 1971